Cymric may refer to:

 Cymric, an adjective meaning 'of or having to do with Wales'
 Welsh culture
 Welsh language
 SS Cymric, a steamship launched in 1897 and torpedoed in 1916
 Cymric (schooner), an Arklow schooner, launched in 1893 and lost during World War II in 1944 
 Cymric cat, a breed of domestic cat, also known as the Longhair Manx
 Cymric Oil Field, an oil field in California, United States
 Cymric, Saskatchewan, a former community in Canada
 Cymric, a brand name of gold- and silverware by Liberty & Co, equivalent to the pewter Tudric

See also
 Welsh (disambiguation)
 Cambrian (disambiguation), an etymological related word, also referring (in geographical and cultural senses) to Wales
 Cumbrian (disambiguation), an etymological related word, referring to the area north of Wales
 Cumbric, an extinct Brittonic language or dialect of what is now Cumbria, closely related to Welsh